Leostyletus is a genus of sea slugs, specifically of aeolid nudibranchs.

Species
Species in this genus include:
 Leostyletus misakiensis (Baba, 1960)
 Leostyletus pseudomisakiensis Martynov, 1998

References

Eubranchidae